Stefano Fantoni (born 4 June 1945) is an Italian theoretical physicist, now retired from the International School for Advanced Studies in Trieste (SISSA), still working in the fields of nuclear physics and low temperature physics. 

The common denominator of his research was to go beyond the mean-field models in solving the so-called many-body theory that occurs in quantum Bose or/and Fermi systems, characterized by the presence of strong correlations among their components. In the seventies he has been the author, together with Sergio Rosati, of the Power Series cluster theory for strongly interacting fermions, known as FR cluster expansion, and later, of the Fermion Hyper Netted Chain (FHNC) integral equations to compute the FR expansion terms at all orders. Such theories have opened up the modern many-body studies on strongly interacting Fermi systems, such as nuclear matter and Quantum fluids. It is due to him and to V. R. Pandharipande and O. Benhar, the extension at all perturbative orders of the so called Correlated Basis Function (CBF) theory, originally developed by E. Feenberg, and the proof of its renormalizability, as well as the first realistic calculation of the one-body Green's Function and the Response functions of Nuclear matter, largely used to explain the experimental results of electron and neutrino scattering on heavy nuclei. Also of great importance are his studies done together with Kevin Schmidt on Quantum Monte Carlo methods for nuclear systems, and particularly the development of the Auxiliary Field Diffusion Monte Carlo (AFDMC) method, heavily used in nuclear and neutron matter calculations.

Biography 

Stefano Fantoni was born in Taranto on 4 June 1945. He attended the high school in Livorno,  graduated in Physics in 1968 from   University of Pisa, and received his PhD degree in 1970 from the Scuola Normale Superiore.

He first worked as an assistant lecturer at the University of Pisa from November 1970 and then as Associate Professor since 1972. In 1986 he became full professor and three-month later he was given the chair of Nuclear Physics at the University of Lecce. 
From 1991 to 2000 he acted as Director of the Interdisciplinary Laboratory of the International School for Advanced Studies, SISSA in Trieste. 
In 2004 he was elected and nominated as SISSA Director, duty that he has covered until November 2010. Stefano Fantoni married in 1969 and has two children and two grandchildren

Research activity 

Fantoni's research activity has been mainly devoted to quantum liquids of interest of nuclear and condensed matter phenomena typical of low temperature physics. He started doing research during his graduation thesis in light nuclei with his first article in 1970 on 6Li. 
He is today among the three topmost scientists of Italian nationality in the field of theoretical Nuclear physics. 

The common denominator of his research was to go beyond the mean-field models in solving the so-called many-body theory that occurs in quantum Bose or/and Fermi systems, characterized by the presence of strong correlations among their components. In this context he gave four main contributions: (i) the development cluster expansion techniques, known in the literature as the Fantoni-Rosati (FR) cluster expansion, (ii) the derivation of the Fermi Hyper Netted Chain (FHNC) equations, to sum up series of cluster terms (iii) the development of Correlated Basis Function theory (CBF) and, more recently, (iv) the development of a new numerical simulation Monte Carlo method for nuclear systems, known as Auxiliary Field Diffusion Monte Carlo (AFDMC).

Fantoni founded four research groups one in Pisa, a second one in Lecce and a third one in Urbana, Illinois, all in the field of nuclear physics and a fourth one in Trieste in Condensed matter physics.
He also coordinated a research group made of few Italian and foreign universities and research laboratories in the field of nuclear astrophysics.  

He has been the Italian representative of nuclear physics in several international bodies dealing with future perspectives in nuclear physics and electron scattering off nuclei at intermediate energies.   His research group at the SISSA Interdisciplinary Laboratory has developed a new communication model based on the existing interconnections and inter-relations amongst communicating agents,. The SISSA model has been designed to overcome some of the deficiencies of the traditional top-down model in which communication simply flows from those who know to those who do not know.  In connections with this kind of research Stefano Fantoni founded in 2005 the first PhD school in Science and Society supported by both SISSA and the University of Milan.
Fantoni has been co-editor of the series Tessere (Cuen editing company, Naples) (1994–1998); publisher of the e-journal JCOM from its foundation in 2004 and author of various articles in newspapers and books and of a dozen research articles on science communication.

International experience 

Stefano Fantoni spent several stays abroad as visiting professor: in 1977 at the Niels Bohr Institute of Copenhagen  in 1979 at the Institute fur Physik in Koln; from 1980 to 1982 and in 1984 at the Department of Physics, University of Illinois at Urbana–Champaign in 1990 at the Jefferson Laboratory (CEBAF) in Newport News, Virginia, r; in 2000 at the Theory Center Seattle (Washington).

He has also been a consultant of the National Science Foundation and of the European Commission in the framework of INTAS program; italian delegate to the OECD Committee Megaforum Science in Nuclear Physics in 1997 and 1998; member of the Program Advisory Committee for the Jefferson Laboratory at Newport News in Virginia from 1989 to 1993, when the accelerator was still under construction and the center began to outline its strategic lines of experimental research; member and then chairman of the Program Advisory Committee of INFN laboratories in Legnaro (Padova) in the period 1991–1996; member of the board of directors of the European Center for Theoretical Studies in Nuclear Physics and related areas (ECT*) in 1993, when it was founded in Villazzano (Trento), until 1995; during the period 2003/2009 he was member of the International Advisory Committee of the Institute for Advanced Studies, Collegium Budapest.

Evaluation and management experience 

Stefano Fantoni was the founder of the Elba International Physics Center (EIPC) which he directed from 1985 to 1992. During this period EIPC acted as the Italian counterpart of the Aspen Center for Physics in Colorado, organizing conferences and workshops funded by local administration and some international research centers.
In the period 1992–1993 Stefano Fantoni took part, as italian member, together with the Danish nobelist Ben Mottelson and the french scientist Oriol Bohigas, in the Committee nominated to establish the European Centre for Theoretical Physics, ECT*. The center is still in operation in the fields of nuclear physics, astrophysics and condensed matter. From 1991 to 2000 he directed the Interdisciplinary Laboratory of SISSA, a laboratory having the mission of developing and promoting new research areas. He founded the Neuroscience sector. In 1994 he founded the School in Science Communication which he directed until 2004.

He was also President of FEST, the Trieste Festival of Scientific books and journals in the years 2007 and 2008. 
Stefano Fantoni has been the Director of SISSA from 2004 to 2010 and member of CRUI, the association of the Rectors of the Italian universities, in the same period. His period as director has been characterized  by the  design and construction of the new SISSA location, a building of almost 25000mq, 150000mq able to host the whole educational and research activity of SISSA. 
He has been nominated as the president of the International Foundation for the Development of Freedom of Science (FIT) in Trieste in 2008. In the same year he was nominated from the regional administration of Friuli Venezia Giulia as delegate to the commission Coordination of universities and research institutions of the Friuli Venezia Giulia.
He has also been nominated as the president of the Trieste section of Alliance Francaise in 2009. 
Fantoni was a member of the national committee for the evaluation of the basic research projects (FIRB committee) from 2007 to 2010 and member of the national committee to evaluate scientific museums and projects on popularization of science from 1995 to 1997 and from 2009 to 2010.
He has been the first President of ANVUR (the Italian Agency for the evaluation of the university and of the research) (2011–2016). 
He has been the Champion of EuroScience Open Forum (ESOF), in occasion of the nomination of Trieste as European City of Science for the year 2020. He is at present on the board of the EuroScience committee.

Director of SISSA

Champion of ESOF 2020

Prizes and awards 

For his contributions to theoretical nuclear physics and for the development of FHNC theory he has awarded the prestigious international recognition Eugene Feenberg Memorial Medal 2007. For his work in science communication, he received the 2001 Kalinga Prize, awarded by UNESCO. He also received the Award Piazzano in 2002, to have founded and directed the Master in Science communication; in 2006, the Pirelli Internet-ional prize for the multimedia initiative Ulysses in the net of science; in 2007, the Capo d’Orlando prize for his activities in science communication.

Selected works

References

Bibliography

External links 
 Scuola Normale Superiore di Pisa (SNS)
 International School for Advanced Studies (SISSA)

20th-century Italian physicists
Living people
1945 births
People from Taranto
Kalinga Prize recipients
21st-century Italian physicists